Calvert is a rural town and locality in the City of Ipswich, Queensland, Australia.

Geography 
The Main Line railway passes through Calvert as does Western Creek, a tributary of the Bremer River.  A 2014 flood mapping study of the Western Creek catchment has provided more reliable flood information to residents and landowners. In the northern extents elevations rise to 340 metres above sea level around Mount Grandchester No. 2. which is part of the Little Liverpool Range.  The landscape in the southern parts of Calvert is mostly used for agriculture.

History 
The district originally contained an inn opened in 1843 by Owens, later sold to McKeon, and was surveyed in 1854 as the village of Alfred, becoming a stopping place on the coach route the same year. On the 9 March 1931, the district was renamed to Calvert.

Calvert was not one of the original stations on the Main Line railway passing through the district, however in 1865 residents petitioned for a station. In 1866 Western Creek station opened, renamed Calvert in 1884.

Alfred State School opened on 11 March 1872. In 1910 it was renamed Calvert State School. It closed in 1972. It was at 29-35 Newcastle Street.

Sport 
A Paintball centre was established at Cummings Road in 2014. It hosts scenario paintball events and a tournament Speedball paintball series. The centre changed names from Tac Ops Paintball to Valhalla Paintball in 2021.

References

External links 
 
"Calvert State School". Queensland Government.

City of Ipswich
Localities in Queensland